Yunus Rajabi museum - National artist of Uzbekistan Yunus Rajabiy, a museum dedicated to his life and work. It is situated in Yakkasaray destrict in Tashkent.

Describtion
The museum was established by his son Hasan Rajabi in December 1997, on the eve of the 100th anniversary of Yunus Rajabi's birth. On the first floor of the museum there is a momerial and instrument exposition room and a hotel. In the momorial room, Yunus Rajabi's furniture, radio, outerwear, musical instrument, sheet music, pen, and tea cups are placed on his table. This museum is one of the most famous house-museums in Tashkent, it is well organized,serves a large number of visitors, and conducts good excursions.

References

Museums in Uzbekistan